Dismissal (also called firing) is the termination of employment by an employer against the will of the employee. Though such a decision can be made by an employer for a variety of reasons, ranging from an economic downturn to performance-related problems on the part of the employee, being fired has a strong stigma in some cultures.

To be dismissed, as opposed to quitting voluntarily (or being laid off), is often perceived as being the employee's fault. Finding new employment may often be difficult after being fired, particularly if there is a history of being terminated from a previous job, if the reason for firing is for some serious infraction, or the employee did not keep the job very long. Job seekers will often not mention jobs that they were fired from on their resumes; accordingly, unexplained gaps in employment are often regarded as a red flag.

Usage
While the main formal term for ending someone's employment is "dismissal", there are a number of colloquial or euphemistic expressions for the same action.

"Firing" is a common colloquial term in the English language (particularly used in the U.S. and Canada), which may have originated in the 1910s at the National Cash Register Company. Other terms for dismissal are being "sacked", "canned", "let go", "ran-off", "axed", being given walking papers, the pink slip or one's cards, or "boned". Other terms, more often used in Commonwealth countries, include "to get the boot" and "to get the sack".

Reasons
Most US states have adopted the at-will employment contract that allows the employer to dismiss employees without having to provide a justified reason for firing, although the variety of court cases that have come out of "at-will" dismissals have made such at-will contracts ambiguous. Often, an at-will termination is handled as a "layoff". Sometimes, an employee will be dismissed if an employer can find better employees than the incumbent, even if the fired employee has not technically broken any rules. This is common with probationary employees who were recently hired, but who cannot adjust to the environment of the workplace, or those who have been around for a long time, but can be replaced with a less experienced employee who can be paid a lower salary. In contrast, a dismissal in France is subjected to a just cause and a formal procedure.

Some examples include conflict of interest, where the employee has done nothing wrong, but the presence of the employee on the employer's payroll may be harmful to the employer. For example: 
 A close relative (spouse, sibling, child or parent) of a member of the executive management of a company might not be able to work for a competitor where they could know trade secrets or where they themselves are part of the other company's executive management due to requirements for competition or antitrust prohibitions.
 This may be the case when two members of the same family become employed by the firm. 
 In other cases, those who report wrongdoing in the workplace, known as whistleblowers, put their job at risk because they might be retaliated against.

More common reasons for firing include attendance problems, insubordination (talking back to a manager or supervisor), drinking alcoholic beverages or doing illegal drugs at work, or consuming the same substances before work and showing up to work while intoxicated or "high" (an especially serious problem in jobs where the worker drives a vehicle, boat or aircraft or operates heavy machinery) or off job-site conduct.

Additional consequences
Some fired employees may face additional consequences besides their dismissal. This may occur when the reason for the termination is a violation of criminal law, or if serious damages are caused to the employer as a result of the employee's actions. Such ex-employees may face criminal prosecution, a civil lawsuit, or a reporting to a database of those who have engaged in serious misconduct in such a position, so that the chances of ever obtaining a similar position with another employer are less likely (blacklisting). Some examples are a caregiver who engages in abuse, a bank teller who has stolen money from the cash drawer, or a member of law enforcement who has committed police brutality.

For the most serious violations, especially when the employer's security may be at risk from the employee in question, a guard or officer may escort a fired employee from the workplace to the parking lot upon their dismissal. Such actions are often taken by government offices or large corporations that contain sensitive materials, and where the risk exists that the terminated employee may remove some of these materials or otherwise steal trade secrets in order to retaliate against the employer or use it to the advantage of a competing enterprise.

Problem employees
Though many employers would like to get rid of their "problem employees", some employers are reluctant to fire those who one would expect would be deserving of termination. There are many reasons for this, which may include: Some positions may be hard to fill. This may be the case with a rare skilled position, or with certain low-wage jobs that are generally unattractive, where finding applicants is difficult. A person who has unusual skills, or who is doing a job that is considered undesirable, such as cleaning sewage from pipes, may be hard to replace. As such, a person in this position may be retained even if they have absenteeism or conduct problems.

Another reason that bosses do not fire some problem employees is from a fear of retaliation. Sometimes the employer must be concerned about various types of action the former employee may take against the company, such as filing a wrongful termination suit: The terminated employee may take legal action in response to the firing. While laws vary in each country and jurisdiction, many employers keep extensive documentation of disciplinary action, evaluations, attendance records, and correspondence from supervisors, co-workers and customers in order to defend themselves in the event of such a suit. Additionally, the at-will employment contract, where the law permits, allows the employer to dismiss employees without having to provide a reason, though this has sometimes been challenged in court. As well, the employer may be concerned that the employee could make a negative report to public by divulging things about the company to others, thereby hurting their business; or that the employee may disclose trade secrets—a former employee may remove materials or divulge confidential information from the former employer and use it with another employer or in an independent business.

Some employers may be afraid that a worker may make a report to law enforcement if the employer's practices are illegal. Other fears include the risk of sabotage by damaging machinery, erasing computer files, or shredding documents; or even violence: in some more extreme cases, fired employees have attacked or even killed their former employers or the staff at their old company or organization, sometimes known in slang as "going postal". In some cases, this has occurred several months or years after termination. Some employers terminate their staff off-site to avoid these issues, or they ban any terminated staff on their premises.

Other reasons include:
Unemployment insurance costs: In the United States of America and some other countries, such benefits are financed by employers. A firm's unemployment costs increase with each worker laid off or fired.
Relationship: The problem employee may have a special relationship with the boss, which is not necessarily romantic, but the employee may be a family member or close friend, or the employee may provide other needed connections for the employer.
Dependence on the employee: Despite the hardships the employee brings to the organization, the employer may find the employee useful in other ways. The employee may hold some rare knowledge or skill that is not easily replaceable.
Sympathy: A sympathetic boss may feel bad about firing an employee.
Culture: In some cultures, it is against the values of the employer to fire a long-serving, hard-working employee, even during an economic downturn (e.g., in Japan).

Counteractions
Employers have several methods of countering some of these potential threats. A common method is forced resignation, and it allows the employee to resign as if by choice, thereby freeing the employer of the burden of a firing.  Other methods used by employers include:
Termination by mutual agreement: The employer and employee make a joint decision to end employment. Though it may be debatable if the termination was truly mutual, the employer offers the employee a "softened firing" in order to reduce backlash.
Severance package: The employee is offered some extended pay or benefits and a glowing reference in exchange for departure. In turn, the ex-employee agrees not to sue, file for unemployment, or take any other action that would hurt the employer.
Demotion: The employee is moved to a lower position, their hours or pay are cut, or the working environment is made increasingly unattractive in hopes of getting the employee to depart voluntarily. In some cases, the employee is officially kept as an employee, but offered little or no work.
Change of role: The employer may modify the employee's duties so the employee doesn't feel dishonored by the changes, but no longer performs the duties with which they were struggling.
Unpaid leave: To avoid being fired as a cost-cutting measure, an employee may agree to take time off without pay, either spread out over a long period (e.g., taking off one day a week without pay over a year), or concentrated (e.g., taking off one month without pay).

Forced resignations 
A forced resignation is when an employee is required to depart from their position due to some issue caused by their continued employment. A forced resignation may be due to the employer's wishes to dismiss the employee, but the employer may be offering a softened firing, or in a high-profile position, the employee may want to leave before the press learns more negative information about one's controversial nature. To avoid this, and to allow the dismissed employee to "save face" in a more "graceful" exit, the employer will often ask the employee to resign "voluntarily" from their position. If the employee chooses not to resign, the processes necessary to fire them may be pursued, and the employee will usually be fired. The resignation thus makes it unclear whether the resignation was forced or voluntary, and this opaqueness may benefit both parties.

Discriminatory and retaliatory termination
In some cases, the firing of an employee is a discriminatory act. Although an employer may often claim the dismissal was for "just cause", these discriminatory acts are often because of the employee's legally protected characteristics, which vary from place to place.  They may include physical or mental disability, age, race, religion, gender, HIV status or sexual orientation. Other unjust firings may result from a workplace manager or supervisor wanting to retaliate against an employee. Often, this is because the worker reported wrongdoing (often, but not always sexual harassment or other misconduct) on the part of the supervisor. Such terminations are often illegal. Many successful lawsuits have resulted from discriminatory or retaliatory termination.

Under US law, workers are entitled to workplace decisions that do not discriminate against their membership in a protected group such as national origin, but they are not entitled to overall fairness. It is legal for an American employee to be fired for things such as disagreeing with the employer or not getting along well with others, even if the employee is correct. 

Discriminatory or retaliatory termination by a supervisor can take the form of administrative process. In this form the rules of the institution are used as the basis for termination. For example, if a place of employment has a rule that prohibits personal phone calls, receiving or making personal calls can be the grounds for termination even though it may be a common practice within the organization.

Changes of conditions
Employers who wish for an employee to exit of their own accord, but do not wish to pursue firing or forced resignation, may degrade the employee's working conditions, hoping that he or she will leave "voluntarily". The employee may be moved to a different geographical location, assigned to an undesirable shift, given too few hours if part-time, demoted (or relegated to a menial task), or assigned to work in uncomfortable conditions. Other forms of manipulation may be used, such as being unfairly hostile to the employee, and punishing them for things that are deliberately overlooked with other employees. Such tactics may amount to constructive dismissal, which is illegal in some jurisdictions.

Rehire following termination
Depending on the circumstances, a person whose employment has been terminated may not be eligible for being rehired by the same employer. If the decision to terminate was the employee's, the willingness of the employer to rehire is often contingent upon the relationship the employee had with the employer, the amount of notice given by the employee prior to departure, and the needs of the employer. In some cases, when an employee departed on good terms, they may be given special priority by the employer when seeking rehire. 

An employee may be terminated without prejudice, meaning the fired employee may be rehired for the same job in the future. This is usually true in the case of layoff. Conversely, a person can be terminated with prejudice, meaning an employer will not rehire the former employee for the same job in the future. This can be for many reasons: incompetence, misconduct (such as dishonesty or "zero tolerance" violations), policy violation, insubordination or "attitude" (personality clashes with peers or bosses). Termination forms ("pink slips" in the U.S. and Canada) routinely include a set of check boxes where a supervisor can indicate "with prejudice" or "without prejudice". During the Vietnam War, the CIA used this terminology with regard to its locally hired operatives. In the case of severe misconduct, it is alleged that the CIA would assassinate them or "terminate with extreme prejudice".

See also 
Turnover
Employee exit management
Job security
Termination of employment in Argentina

References

Benedict, Bailey (May 2017). "An Exploration of Coworker Dismissal: Uncertainty, Message Characteristics, and Information Seeking". Pro Quest.

Gosset, Steve (Oct 1999). “Sometimes You Do Have to Fire People”. Harvard Management Communication Letter. 2 (10). 

Cox & Kramer, Stephen & Michael (November 1995). “Communication During Employee Dismissals: Social Exchange Principles and Group Influences on Employee Exit” Management Communication Quarterly. 9 (2).

External links

Termination of employment